Carl Gustav Jung (1875–1961) was the founder of analytical psychology.

Jung may also refer to:
 Jung (surname)
 Jung (Korean given name)
 JUNG, the Java Universal Network/Graph Framework
 Jung (1996 film)
 Jung (2000 film)
 Jung, Victoria, Australia

See also
 Arnold Jung Lokomotivfabrik, German locomotive manufacturer
 Jeong (surname)
 Jung-Kellogg Library, at Missouri Baptist University
 Salar Jung Museum, in India
 Xirong (Hsi-jung), ancient barbarian peoples
 Young (disambiguation)
 Yung (disambiguation)
 Djong (ship)